The DT postcode area, also known as the Dorchester postcode area, is a group of eleven postcode districts in South West England, within nine post towns. These cover much of Dorset (including Dorchester, Weymouth, Beaminster, Blandford Forum, Bridport, Lyme Regis, Portland, Sherborne and Sturminster Newton), plus very small parts of Devon and Somerset.



Coverage
The approximate coverage of the postcode districts:

|-
! DT1
| DORCHESTER
| Dorchester, Poundbury
| Dorset
|-
! DT2
| DORCHESTER
| Athelhampton, Puddletown, Crossways, Winfrith Newburgh, Winterborne St Martin, Puncknowle, West Bexington, Maiden Newton, Evershot, Charminster, Cerne Abbas, Buckland Newton, Pulham
| Dorset
|-
! DT3
| WEYMOUTH
| Chickerell, Broadwey, Radipole, Osmington, Preston, Littlemoor, Portesham, Abbotsbury, Langton Herring
| Dorset
|-
! DT4
| WEYMOUTH
| Weymouth town centre, Melcombe Regis, Westham, Wyke Regis
| Dorset
|-
! DT5
| PORTLAND
| Fortuneswell, Easton, Southwell, Weston, The Grove
| Dorset
|-
! DT6
| BRIDPORT
| Bridport, Melplash, Whitchurch Canonicorum, Charmouth, Burton Bradstock, Powerstock
| Dorset
|-
! DT7
| LYME REGIS
| Lyme Regis, Uplyme, Rousdon
| Dorset, East Devon
|-
! DT8
| BEAMINSTER
| Beaminster, Broadwindsor
| Dorset
|-
! DT9
| SHERBORNE
| Sherborne, Milborne Port, Holwell, Longburton, Yetminster, Bradford Abbas, Charlton Horethorne
| Dorset, South Somerset
|-
! DT10
| STURMINSTER NEWTON
| Sturminster Newton, Stalbridge, Hazelbury Bryan, Marnhull, Stourton Caundle, Hinton St Mary
| Dorset
|-
! DT11
| BLANDFORD FORUM
| Blandford Forum, Blandford Camp, Iwerne Courtney, Iwerne Minster, Shillingstone, Milton Abbas, Winterborne Zelston, Spetisbury
| Dorset
|}

Map

See also
List of postcode areas in the United Kingdom
Postcodes in the United Kingdom
Postcode Address File

References

External links
Royal Mail's Postcode Address File
A quick introduction to Royal Mail's Postcode Address File (PAF)
Postcode finder

Postcode areas covering South West England